Lord Roose Bolton is a fictional character in the A Song of Ice and Fire series of fantasy novels by American author George R. R. Martin, and its television adaptation Game of Thrones.

Introduced in 1996's A Game of Thrones, Roose, a Northern lord with his seat at the Dreadfort, is a retainer of Lord Eddard Stark. His family is notorious for their cruelty and custom of flaying their enemies; he frequently has himself leeched, leading him to be known as the Leech Lord across Westeros. He later appears in A Clash of Kings (1998), A Storm of Swords (2000), and A Dance with Dragons (2011).

Roose joins Robb Stark's rebellion as one of his chief lieutenants. With the help of the Brave Companions, he takes and holds Harrenhal until rejoining Robb Stark to help retake the Neck occupied by the Greyjoys. In truth he is a chief orchestrator of the Red Wedding alongside Tywin Lannister and Walder Frey, receiving the title of Warden of the North from the former after personally slaying Robb. His rule as Warden in the North is punctuated by unrest, and several forces conspire to unseat him and House Frey and restore the Starks to power.

Roose is portrayed by Irish actor Michael McElhatton in the HBO television adaptation.

Character description
Lord Roose Bolton is a significant vassal of Lord Eddard Stark. His seat is the Dreadfort and his sigil is a flayed man, a homage to the ancient Bolton tradition of flaying enemies. He is nicknamed the Leech Lord for regular leechings meant to improve his health.

Roose Bolton is not a point of view character in the novels, so his actions are witnessed and interpreted through the eyes of other people, such as Catelyn Stark, Arya Stark and Theon Greyjoy/Reek.

Background
Roose illicitly practiced an ancient and banned tradition called the first night, in which a lord had the right to bed a commoner's wife. One day, prior to Robert's Rebellion, Roose was fox hunting along the Weeping Water when he came across a young woman washing clothes in the stream, who was married to the old miller without Roose's knowledge. Desiring the woman, and angered for not being informed of the marriage, Roose had the miller hanged and violently raped the woman beneath the tree where her husband still hung.

A year later, the woman came to the Dreadfort with a newborn boy whom she claimed was Roose's bastard, named Ramsay. Roose considered having the woman whipped and the baby killed before realizing that the baby is indeed his, owing to its pale, cold eyes. He gave the woman money and annual supplies as payment to raise Ramsay, and had the tongue of the miller's brother cut out to prevent Lord Rickard Stark from being informed of his illegal activities. He sent his odious and depraved servant Reek to the young Ramsay and his mother after the latter demands a servant to help raise the boy, an act he considers to be highly amusing. Roose later participates in Robert's Rebellion and (according to a semi-canonical source) the Greyjoy Rebellion.

Despite Roose's orders, Roose's only trueborn son, Domeric, seeks out Ramsay. Domeric dies soon after, and Roose suspects that Ramsay poisoned Domeric to become his heir. Roose, left without a trueborn heir, brings Ramsay to the Dreadfort, where he later serves as the fortress's castellan and has thus far refused to legitimize or otherwise acknowledge him as his true heir. He considers his bastard son foolhardy and tactless, with "tainted blood [that] would poison even the leeches".

Appearance and personality
Roose is most often described as an oddly average and unassuming-looking man, clean-shaven with pallid skin. He is often described as ageless, with an apathetic demeanor that betrays nothing. His most prominent feature are his strangely pale and cold eyes, so light as to almost blend with the sclera.

Roose appears to be unassuming and mild-mannered, although in truth he is remorseless and unforgiving, possessed of the same cruelty and ruthlessness his house is notorious for. Theon Greyjoy believes that he is even more cruel and menacing than his bastard son, despite Ramsay's more evident depravity. While his voice is small and soft, he does not need to raise it in order to inspire silence and attention – Jaime Lannister and Robb Stark both remark that even just his silence is threatening. His personal motto is "A peaceful land, a quiet people", a lesson he has thus far failed to instill into his bastard son; he doesn't care about the welfare of his people, he just seeks to avoid any possible rebellion. He often dresses in a pale pink fur cloak embroidered in blood red to symbolize his family's custom of flaying.

Storylines

A Game of Thrones 

Roose is amongst the lords who travel to Winterfell to aid Robb Stark in his campaign against the Lannisters. His intelligence and caution sees him given command of part of the Northern host when the army splits up at the Twins, and he leads the attack on Tywin Lannister's army in the Battle of the Green Fork. The battle ends in a Lannister victory and Roose retreats with the survivors to the causeway of Moat Cailin.
In the novels, it is implied that Roose battled with Tywin, not just to distract him and allow Robb to pass, but also to weaken the houses he was given command over: in the battle, Tyrion sees Bolton soldiers in the retroguard, while the vanguard is composed entirely with soldiers of the other Northern Houses. While the two vanguards clash, it also starts to rain arrows over both sides. While Tyrion doesn't know from where the arrows came from, it can be assumed that they were fired by Roose, since Tywin is not the type of person that wastes men and arrows.

A Clash of Kings 

To form an alliance with House Frey, Roose is offered by Lord Walder Frey one of his female family members hand in marriage, as well as offering the prospective bride's weight in silver for her dowry. Roose chooses "Fat" Walda Frey, the fattest female member of House Frey. He also makes an alliance with the Brave Companions, Essosi sellswords employed by Tywin, to help the Northerners capture Harrenhal from the Lannister force occupying it. After capturing Harrenhal Roose takes Arya Stark as a servant, mistaking her for a commoner. In a conversation Arya casually hears, Roose and the Freys point that Robb cannot win the war, since Tywin formed an alliance with High Garden. It is assumed that Roose and the Frey started to plan their betrayal, at this point.

A Storm of Swords 

While in Harrenhal, Roose weakens Robb's army over and over again, sending other lords on suicidal missions. Hoat brings Jaime Lannister to Harrenhal, having cut off Jaime's hand in hope of blaming Roose and preventing the Boltons allying with the Lannisters. Roose has Jaime sent back to King's Landing after Jaime assures Roose that he will not blame him. Roose then travels to the Twins for Edmure Tully's wedding to Roslin Frey, but at the wedding the Freys turn on the Starks and Roose personally kills Robb Stark. It is revealed that Roose had conspired with the Freys and Tywin Lannister to betray the Starks. As reward for his service, Tywin names Roose the new Warden of the North

A Feast for Crows and A Dance With Dragons 

Roose returns to the North with his forces, joined by two thousand Frey men. Meeting with Ramsay (now legitimised as a Bolton) and a captive Theon Greyjoy, the Boltons travel to Barrowton for Ramsay's wedding to Jeyne Poole, forced to assume the identity of Arya Stark. After hearing that Stannis Baratheon has captured Deepwood Motte, Roose decides to move the wedding to Winterfell to bait Stannis out. The Boltons and their Northern allies (many of whom are only grudgingly pledging fealty to the Boltons, or plan to betray them) remain at Winterfell after the wedding in anticipation of Stannis' attack. Tensions are high during the wedding due to the anger of the Northmen at the Freys. Three of the Freys who had been travelling with Lord Wyman Manderly of White Harbor, who lost his younger son Ser Wendel Manderly at the Red Wedding, have disappeared, and are heavily implied to have been put in pies which Wyman gives to the Freys and Boltons, eating some himself. Lady Barbrey Dustin of Barrowton, the younger sister of Bethany Ryswell, tells Theon that Roose has no feelings and plays with people for amusement. She also insinuates that Roose hopes to become King in the North, not just Warden, because the Lannisters are weakened. When one of Walder Frey's grandsons, Little Walder Frey, is found murdered, their uncle Ser Hosteen Frey attacks Wyman, leading to a fight in which White Harbor and Frey men are killed. Roose is forced to send them both out of Winterfell to encounter Stannis, in order to weaken both Frey's and Manderly's armies.

Family tree of House Bolton 

 

Notes

TV adaptation 

Roose Bolton is played by Michael McElhatton in the HBO television adaption of the series of books. He and the rest of the cast were nominated for Screen Actors Guild Awards for Outstanding Performance by an Ensemble in a Drama Series in 2014.

Second season 
Roose declares for King in the North Robb Stark and serves as a chief member of his war council, although Robb sternly admonishes Roose when he advocates flaying Lannister prisoners to obtain information. After Theon Greyjoy betrays the Starks and seizes Winterfell, Roose brings the news to Robb and offers to send his bastard son Ramsay Snow with a force of Dreadfort men to oust Theon and the Ironborn from Winterfell.

Third season 

Following the Northern army's arrival at Harrenhal, Roose presents a letter from Ramsay claiming that the Ironborn sacked Winterfell before fleeing. Robb orders Roose and the Bolton forces to hold Harrenhal while the rest of his army rides to Riverrun. One of Roose's man-at-arms, Locke, captures the escaped Jaime Lannister and his escort Brienne of Tarth, cutting off Jaime's swordhand in the process, before bringing the two to Harrenhal. Roose agrees to let Jaime go, but keeps Brienne as a hostage, though Jaime later returns to secure her release. He then meets up with the Stark army at the Twins for the wedding of Edmure Tully and Roslin Frey. However, it is revealed that Roose has conspired with Lord Walder Frey to betray the Starks, and after the wedding the Freys and Bolton slaughter the Stark forces, with Roose personally killing Robb. As part of the Bolton-Frey alliance, Roose agrees to marry Walder's daughter Walda - Walder offers him the bride's weight in silver as dowry, so Roose decides to marry the fattest of Walder's daughters. In the aftermath of the massacre, Roose hints to Walder that his betrayal of Robb was motivated by resentment at having his advice ignored by Robb. Roose also reveals that Winterfell was actually sacked by his bastard Ramsay, who subsequently flayed the Ironborn garrison there and took Theon prisoner, for his own amusement. As reward for his defection, Tywin Lannister names Roose the Warden of the North.

Fourth season 
With the Ironborn holding Moat Cailin - the fortification barring passage between the North and the rest of Westeros - Roose is forced to smuggle himself back into the North. Upon his return to the Dreadfort, he chastises Ramsay for having gelded Theon and sending terms of surrender to the Greyjoys without his approval, while reminding Ramsay of his bastard parentage. Insulted, Ramsay demonstrates how effectively he has broken Theon (whom he has since renamed "Reek") by having Reek shave him, even after revealing Roose's murder of Robb, while also coaxing Reek into revealing he faked the deaths of Bran and Rickon Stark. After Ramsay points out that the other Northerners will turn on the Boltons if it is revealed that there is a living male Stark, Roose tasks Locke with hunting down Bran and Rickon and killing Jon Snow, Robb's bastard half-brother. Roose also sends Ramsay and Reek to lift the siege of Moat Cailin; when Ramsay is successful, Roose presents him with a royal decree of legitimisation as a trueborn Bolton. Roose subsequently moves to rebuild and occupy Winterfell.

Fifth season 
In the aftermath of Tywin Lannister's death and Ramsay's murder of a disobedient vassal and his family, Roose seeks to secure House Bolton's position by arranging to have Ramsay marry Sansa Stark, supposedly the last trueborn Stark alive. In doing so, Roose seemingly secures an alliance with the forces of the Vale and its Lord Protector Petyr "Littlefinger" Baelish (unaware that Baelish intends on having the Bolton army decimated by the approaching Baratheon army before defeating the victor with the Vale's army). After Ramsay torments Sansa by having Reek serve them at dinner, Roose announces that he and Walda are expecting a son. However, later Roose privately reassures Ramsay of his position as his heir, and asks him to assist in defeating Stannis Baratheon's army. To this end, Roose permits Ramsay and his men to launch a sneak attack on Stannis' camp, destroying the army's supplies. With the supplies destroyed and most of Stannis' army subsequently deserting him, the Boltons easily defeat the Baratheons when they attempt to lay siege to Winterfell, but in the aftermath of the battle, Theon Greyjoy and Sansa manage to escape, severely jeopardizing House Bolton's rule in the North.

Sixth season 
Despite their victory over Stannis Baratheon, Roose warns Ramsay that the North will someday have to face the Lannisters, and chastises him for allowing Sansa and Theon to escape, as Sansa was crucial to unifying the North. He implies that if Sansa is not recovered, Ramsay's position as heir may be usurped by Walda's baby. Soon afterwards, it is announced that Walda has given birth to a boy; Ramsay immediately kills Roose by stabbing him in the stomach, before setting his dogs upon Walda and the baby, leaving Ramsay as the last remaining Bolton. Ramsay is ultimately killed when Jon Snow retakes Winterfell in the Battle of the Bastards, leaving House Bolton extinct.

References 

A Song of Ice and Fire characters
Fictional murdered people
Literary characters introduced in 1996
Fictional domestic abusers
Fictional lords and ladies
Fictional mass murderers
Fictional rapists
Fictional regicides
Fictional torturers
Male literary villains
Male characters in literature
Male characters in television
Patricide in fiction
Television characters introduced in 2012